Tygerberg is a district in the northern suburbs of Cape Town in South Africa. It is also the name of the range of hills in the area. The main Tygerberg farms were Pampoenkraal (became Durbanville), Stellenburgh (became part of Bellville), Evertsdal (today Bellville), De Grendel (today Parow), Lebenstijn (part of Bellville), Blommensteijn (incorporated into Bellville), Door de Kraal (incorporated into Bellville), Vissershok (which has no more farming as it became a quarry with mining activities) and Clara Anna Fontein. It also contains the Tygerberg Nature Reserve.

Tygerberg is host to the Tygerberg Hospital. The hospital is the centre for the Medicine and Health Sciences faculty of Stellenbosch University. (Afrikaans: Universiteit Stellenbosch)

The Parow satellite campus of the German International School Cape Town, in proximity to Tygerberg, serves German-speaking students up to grade 4.

See also
 Tygerberg Zoo
 Tyger Valley 
 Tygerberg Nature Reserve

References

External links
 Web page for Universiteit Stellenbosch (in Afrikaans)

Suburbs of Cape Town